The Castilletes Formation (N1c) is a fossiliferous geological formation of the Cocinetas Basin in the northernmost department of La Guajira, Colombia. The formation consists of fossiliferous mudstones, siltstones and medium-grained to conglomeratic fossiliferous lithic to quartzitic sandstones.

Etymology 
The formation was defined by Rollins in 1965 and named after the village of Castilletes.

Description

Lithologies 
The Castilletes Formation consists of fossiliferous mudstones, siltstones and medium-grained to conglomeratic fossiliferous lithic to quartzitic sandstones.

Stratigraphy and depositional environment 
The Castilletes Formation overlies the Jimol Formation and is overlain by the Ware Formation. The age has been estimated to be Middle Miocene (16.7 to 14.2 Ma), Colloncuran and Friasian in the SALMA classification. The invertebrate fauna of the Castilletes Formation is highly similar not only to that of the underlying Jimol Formation, but also to the Cantaure Formation of Venezuela. The Castilletes Formation was deposited in a shallow marine (estuarine, lagoonal, and shallow subtidal) to fluvio-deltaic environment with strong fluvial influence. The Castilletes Formation correlates with the upper Cerro Pelado and Querales Formations of the Venezuelan Falcón Basin. This unit is also correlative with the Cantaure Formation of the Paraguaná Peninsula in Venezuela.

Fossil content

See also 

 Geology of the Eastern Hills
 Cesar-Ranchería Basin
 Honda Group
 Abanico, Pebas, Pisco Formations

References

Bibliography

Local geology

Paleontology

Maps 
 
 
 
 

Geologic formations of Colombia
Neogene Colombia
Burdigalian
Langhian
Miocene Series of South America
Colloncuran
Friasian
Mudstone formations
Siltstone formations
Sandstone formations
Deltaic deposits
Fluvial deposits
Shallow marine deposits
Fossiliferous stratigraphic units of South America
Paleontology in Colombia
Geography of La Guajira Department